The South Australian Speedcar Championship is a Speedcar championship held in the state of South Australia on an annual basis during the Australian speedway season.

South Australia was the third Australian state behind Victoria and New South Wales to race speedcars when races began at the Camden Motordrome on 28 December 1935. Two years later saw the formation of the states first governing body, South Australian Speedways Limited.

The first State Championship was run at the Kilburn Speedway in Adelaide in 1946/47 and was won by Victorian driver Jack O'Dea.

Adelaide based drivers Murray Hoffman, and former Speedcar and Sprintcar national champion Phil March jointly hold the record with four wins each. The now defunct Rowley Park Speedway in Adelaide hosted the championship on 29 occasions between 1959/50 and 1978/79. Speedway Park/City is next hosting on 20 occasions between 1979/80 and 1999/2000.

Of the state titles held since 1946/47, there have been 6 won by overseas visitors. They have been Bob Tattersall (1958/59, 1967/68), Jimmy Davies (1962/63, 1963/64) and Mark Passerrelli (1987/88) from the United States, and New Zealand speedway star Barry Butterworth (1964/65).

One family has made the SA Title record books in recent times with four members of the same family winning the event. Garry Dillon took the win in 1993/94; his son Luke Dillon driving for his Uncle Stephen Dillon won in 2006/07; son Lee Dillon won in 2008/09 driving for fellow SA Speedcar racer Mark Harrington; and cousin Ben Dillon who won the event in 2010/11 driving for his father Stephen.

The reigning SA Champion is NSW's Nathan Smee, until a new winner is crowned at Borderline Speedway, Mount Gambier on Friday 7th January 2022. 

REF: www.SAspeedcars.com

Winners since 1946/47
All drivers are from South Australia (SA) unless otherwise stated.

* Trevor Green, the 1988/89 champion, became the first rookie to win the SA title. He backed it up with his second title in 1989/90.

References

Motorsport competitions in Australia
Speedway in Australia
Speedway